The Gangmasters (Licensing) Act 2004 (c 11) is an Act of the Parliament of the United Kingdom that regulates the agencies that place vulnerable workers in agricultural work, and the shellfish collecting and packing industries (s.3). It is the most recent plank of UK agency worker law. It establishes the Gangmasters Licensing Authority (s.1), which requires that all such agencies have a licence before they operate, and adhere to proper labour practice standards. Most of its provisions came into effect after 2005. The immediate cause of the legislation was the 2004 Morecambe Bay cockling disaster, where 21 Chinese immigrant labourers were left to drown by their employers (the racketeers were subsequently convicted of manslaughter, and some deported back to China) off the coast of Lancashire as the tide swept in around them.

The Gangmasters Licensing Act was based on a voluntary project, the UK Temporary Labour Working Group , carried out by companies in conjunction with trade unions through the Ethical Trading Initiative.  The project provided a working model for how a licensing scheme could work, and also meant that ETI-member companies, including major UK supermarkets, lobbied for the new law.

Licensing
Before 1994, all such agencies were required to be registered under the Employment Agencies Act 1973. However, the Deregulation and Contracting Out Act 1994, a wide-ranging measure designed to trim government, removed this requirement. The 2004 Act requires licences for any business involved in labour placement in the agricultural and shellfish sectors (s.7) and they are contingent on the rules that the Secretary of State lays down (s.8), found in the Gangmasters (Licensing Conditions) 2006.

To obtain a licence, the rules require payment of a fee linked to the agency's turnover (r.7) ranging between £250 and £4000 for businesses turning over under £1m to over £10m respectively. Agencies also have to pay for inspections of their work environment in order to obtain licensing approval (r.8). Based on turnover in the same way, the fees range from £1,600 to £2,500.

Charging fees to labourers directly is prohibited by Schedule r.4(10)(2) and by the Employment Agencies Act 1973 s.6. The rules make the end-user the only one allowed to pay the worker (r.6), restrict the agency's power to contract with the end-user to prevent the worker taking up permanent employment (r.7), prohibit the practice of withholding pay from labourers as a sanction (r.8), require the agency to provide the end-user with a document containing the terms of the agreement on fees, and what to do if the worker is unsatisfactory (r.11); they also prevent gangmasters giving each other workers unless the worker has properly consented (r.16), and require keeping of records for each worker (r.19).

The agency must give the labourer information about his legal rights (r.15). The status of such rights is uncertain, but it would appear that under s.230 of the Employment Rights Act 1996 a worker will be considered the employee of the end-user. Certainly every worker must be paid the minimum wage, receive holiday pay, and must not be subject to discrimination.

Enforcement
The 2004 Act creates a number of offences with heavy penalties. Under s.12(4) offenders can face 10 years imprisonment for operating without a licence. Under s.13, people who deal with unlicensed gangmasters can face 51 weeks jail, unless they can show they took all reasonable steps to establish that the gangmasters were licensed.

Section 29 - Commencement and transitional provision
The following orders have been made under this section:
The Gangmasters (Licensing) Act 2004 (Commencement No. 1) Order 2004 (S.I. 2004/2857 (C. 119))
The Gangmasters (Licensing) Act 2004 (Commencement No. 2) Order 2005 (S.I. 2005/447 (C. 21))
The Gangmasters (Licensing) Act 2004 (Commencement No. 3) Order 2006 (S.I. 2006/2406 (C. 85))
The Gangmasters (Licensing) Act 2004 (Commencement No. 4) Order 2006 (S.I. 2006/2906 (C. 101))
The Gangmasters (Licensing) Act 2004 (Commencement No. 5) Order 2007 (S.I. 2007/695 (C. 29))

See also
UK agency worker law
Agency Workers Directive
Employment Agencies Act 1973

References

External links

United Kingdom labour law
United Kingdom Acts of Parliament 2004
2004 in labor relations